Daniel Kaufmann may refer to:

 Daniel Kaufmann (economist), President of the Revenue Watch Institute
 Daniel Kaufmann (footballer) (born 1990), Liechtensteiner footballer

See also
 Daniel Kaufman (fl. from 1994), an American director, film producer and screenwriter